Ashley William Edgell Winlaw OBE (8 February 1914 – 13 February 1988) was an English cricketer, later a schoolteacher.

Early life
Winlaw was born at Sydenham, London, and educated at St Peter's School, Seaford, Winchester College and St John's College, Cambridge.

Cricket
Winlaw was a right-handed batsman and occasional wicket-keeper, who played the majority of his cricket in minor counties cricket, though he did make one appearance in first-class cricket.

He made his debut in minor counties cricket for Bedfordshire against Buckinghamshire in the 1935 Minor Counties Championship. He played minor counties cricket for Bedfordshire from 1935 to 1939, making thirty appearances. It was in 1936 he made his debut in first-class cricket, having been selected for a combined Minor Counties cricket team against the touring Indians at Lord's. In a match which the Indians won by an innings and 74 runs, Winlaw scored 13 runs in the Minor Counties first-innings before he was dismissed by Amar Singh, while in their second-innings he was dismissed for a duck by Mohammad Nissar.

His brother Roger Winlaw was also a first-class cricketer.

Schoolteacher
Winlaw taught at Aldenham School and Shrewsbury School, then served during World War II in the Intelligence Corps. After the war he taught at several schools in various countries. He was the Headmaster at Achimota College in then Gold Coast colony (modern day Ghana). For his service as headmaster of the Government Cadet College at Hasan Abdal, Pakistan, he was appointed OBE.

Winlaw died at Portsmouth, Hampshire, on 13 February 1988.

References

External links
Ashley Winlaw at ESPNcricinfo
Ashley Winlaw at CricketArchive

1914 births
1988 deaths
People from Sydenham, London
People educated at Winchester College
Alumni of St John's College, Cambridge
English cricketers
Bedfordshire cricketers
Minor Counties cricketers
British Army personnel of World War II
Intelligence Corps officers
Schoolteachers from Hertfordshire
Officers of the Order of the British Empire
Schoolteachers from Shropshire
Ghanaian schoolteachers